The Rio Nuevo is a river in Jamaica. It runs through the parish of Saint Mary, meeting the Caribbean Sea in the Rio Nuevo Bay, on the north Jamaican coast. In 1658, it was the site of the Battle of Rio Nuevo between Spanish and English forces, the largest battle to have been fought on Jamaican soil.

See also
 List of rivers of Jamaica

References
Citations

Bibliography
 Ford, Jos C. and Finlay, A.A.C. (1908).The Handbook of Jamaica. Jamaica Government Printing Office

External links
  GEOnet Names Server
 OMC Map

Rivers of Jamaica